David Warnock, OBE (April 11, 1865 – August 23, 1932) was a politician and veterinarian  from Alberta, Canada. He was educated at the Hamilton Academy, Lanarkshire, Scotland and at the West of Scotland Technical College (eventually becoming in 1964 the University of Strathclyde), graduating MRCVS. In 1889 he emigrated to the North West Territories, Canada.

Early life
David Warnock was born on April 11, 1865 in Hamilton, South Lanarkshire, Scotland. He married Annie Whitelaw in October 1897 and they had two children. He moved to Alberta in December 1889, and to British Columbia on March 27, 1919.

He served as the first president of the Alberta Veterinary Medical Association from 1906 to 1916.

Political career
Warnock was first elected to the Legislative Assembly of Alberta for the Pincher Creek electoral district in the 1909 Alberta general election. He won the a very tight race by less than 100 votes. Less than a year later he resigned his seat and took the opportunity to run in the 1911 Canadian federal election.

In that federal election he ran in the Macleod district defeating incumbent Member of Parliament John Herron. He served one full term in the House of Commons of Canada and did not run again.

Warnock was invested O.B.E. in June 1918 and in 1919 was appointed Deputy Minister for Agriculture, Government of British Columbia, a position he held until a few weeks before his death.

He died on August 23, 1932, drowning after jumping from a coastal steamer near White Rock.

References

External links
Legislative Assembly of Alberta Members Listing
 

1865 births
1932 deaths
Politicians from Hamilton, South Lanarkshire
People educated at Hamilton Academy
Canadian Officers of the Order of the British Empire
Members of the House of Commons of Canada from Alberta
Alberta Liberal Party MLAs
Liberal Party of Canada MPs
Scottish emigrants to Canada
Canadian veterinarians
Male veterinarians
Scottish veterinarians